The Greater Binanderean or Guhu-Oro languages are a language family spoken along the northeast coast of the Papuan Peninsula – the "Bird's Tail" of New Guinea – and appear to be a recent expansion from the north. They were classified as a branch of the Trans–New Guinea languages by Stephen Wurm (1975) and Malcolm Ross (2005), but removed (along with the related Goilalan languages) by Timothy Usher (2020). The Binandere family proper is transparently valid; Ross connected it to the Guhu-Semane isolate based on pronominal evidence, and this has been confirmed by Smallhorn (2011). Proto-Binanderean (which excludes Guhu-Samane) has been reconstructed in Smallhorn (2011).

Language contact
There is evidence that settlements of people speaking Oceanic languages along the Binanderean coast were gradually absorbed into inland communities speaking Binanderean languages (Bradshaw 2017). For instance, the SOV word order of Papuan Tip languages is due to Binanderean influence.

Korafe displays significant influence from Oceanic languages. Meanwhile, Maisin, spoken in Oro Province, is an Oceanic language with very heavy Binanderean influence and shows characteristics typical of mixed languages.

Spoken in Morobe Province, Guhu-Samane is divergent, which may be due to extensive historical contact with Oceanic languages such as Numbami.

Classification
Greater Binanderean consists of the Guhu-Samane language and the Binanderean languages proper.
Smallhorn (2011:444) provides the following classification:

Greater Binanderean
Guhu-Samane
Binanderean
Yekora
North Binanderean
Suena
Zia
Nuclear Binanderean
Binandere
South Binanderean
Orokaivic
Aeka (Northern Orokaiva)
Orokaiva
Hunjara (Mountain Orokaiva)
Coastal Binanderean
Notu-Yega (Ewage)
Gaena-Korafe
Baruga

However, South Binanderean and Nuclear Binanderean are non-genealogical linkages.  
Usher (2020), who calls the Binanderean languages proper "Oro" after Oro Province, classifies them very similarly, apart from not reproducing the non-cladistic linkages:

Guhu–Oro (= Greater Binanderean)
Guhu-Samane
Oro (= Binanderean)
Binandere
Yekora
Ewage-Notu
Suena–Zia (= North Binanderean)
Suena
Zia
Central Oro (= Orokaivic)
Aeka
Orokaiva
Hunjara
Southeast Oro (= Coastal Binanderean, minus Ewage-Notu)
Baruga
Gaina–Korafe
Gaina
Korafe-Yegha

Demographics
Smallhorn (2011:3) provides population figures for the following Binanderean languages.

Guhu-Samane: 12,800
Suena: 3,000
Yekora: 1,000
Zia: 3,000
Mawae: 943
Binandere: 7,000 (including Ambasi)
Aeka: 3,400
Orokaiva: 24,000
Hunjara: 8,770
Notu: 12,900 (including Yega)
Gaena: 1,410
Baruga: 2,230
Doghoro: 270
Korafe: 3,630

Total about 80,000

Proto-language

Pronouns
Ross (2005) reconstructs both independent pronouns and verbal person prefixes:

{|
!sg.!!pronoun!!prefix
|-
!1
|*na||*a-
|-
!2
|*ni||*i-
|-
!3
|*nu||*u-
|}

Only 1sg continues the Trans-New Guinea set.

Vocabulary
The following selected reconstructions of Proto-Binanderean and other lower-level reconstructions are from the Trans-New Guinea database:

{| class="wikitable sortable"
! gloss !! Proto-Binandere !! Proto-North-Binandere !! Proto-Nuclear-Binandere
|-
! head
| *ciro; *giti ||  || 
|-
! hair
| *tu ||  || 
|-
! ear
|  || *doŋgarә || *onje
|-
! eye
| *dibe; *diti ||  || 
|-
! nose
|  || *mendә || 
|-
! tooth
| *di ||  || 
|-
! tongue
| *VwVwV ||  || 
|-
! dog
| *sinә ||  || 
|-
! pig
| *pu ||  || 
|-
! bird
|  ||  || *ndi
|-
! egg
| *munju ||  || 
|-
! blood
| *ju; *or{a,o}rә ||  || 
|-
! bone
| *bobo; *wetu ||  || 
|-
! skin
| *tamә ||  || 
|-
! breast
| *ami ||  || 
|-
! tree
| *i ||  || 
|-
! man
| *embә ||  || 
|-
! woman
| *bam{u,o}nә ||  || *ewVtu
|-
! sky
| *utu ||  || 
|-
! sun
| *iji; *waeko || *wari || 
|-
! moon
| *inua ||  || *kariga
|-
! fire
| *awo ||  || 
|-
! stone
| *g{o,e}mb{a,i}(ro) || *daba || *ganuma
|-
! road, path
| *begata; *esa; *ndai ||  || 
|-
! name
| *jajo; *jawә ||  || 
|-
! eat
| *ind-; *mind- ||  || 
|-
! one
| *daba ||  || 
|}

Evolution

Greater Binanderean reflexes of proto-Trans-New Guinea (pTNG) etyma are:

Binandere language:
 ‘lightning’ < *
 ‘nose’ < *
 ‘kidney, testicles’ < * ‘internal organs’
 ‘eye’ < *
 ‘sap’ < * ‘sap, milk’
 ‘breast’ < *
 ‘head’ < *
 ‘teeth’ < * ‘tooth’
 ‘spittle’, - ‘to spit’ < * ‘to spit’
 ‘father’ < *
 ‘man’ < *
 ‘tree’ < *
 ‘stone’ < *
 ‘darkness’ < * ‘night’
 ‘lightning’ < * ‘(fire)light’
 ‘fire’ < * ‘ashes’
 ‘bird’ < *
 ‘eat, drink’ < *
 ‘to blow’ < * + verb
 ‘short’ < *

Korafe language:
 ‘egg’ < * ‘internal organs’
 ‘urine’ < *
 ‘burning stick’ < * ‘ashes’
 ‘give’ < *
 ‘hear, understand’ < * ‘know’

Suena language:
 ‘destitute’ < * ‘orphan, widow and child’
 ‘mother’ < *
 ‘night’ < *
 ‘taro’ < *
 ‘netbag’ < *

Yega language:
 ‘ear’ < *

Phonotactics
Like the Koiarian languages, Binanderean languages only allow for open syllables and do not allow final CVC.

References

 
 Smallhorn, Jacinta Mary (2011). The Binanderean languages of Papua New Guinea: reconstruction and subgrouping. Canberra: Pacific Linguistics.

Further reading
Proto-Binandere. TransNewGuinea.org. From Smallhorn, J. 2011. The Binanderean languages of Papua New Guinea: reconstruction and subgrouping. Canberra: Pacific Linguistics.
Proto-Nuclear-Binandere. TransNewGuinea.org. From Smallhorn, J. 2011. The Binanderean languages of Papua New Guinea: reconstruction and subgrouping. Canberra: Pacific Linguistics.
Proto-North-Binandere. TransNewGuinea.org. From Smallhorn, J. 2011. The Binanderean languages of Papua New Guinea: reconstruction and subgrouping. Canberra: Pacific Linguistics.
Proto-South-Binandere. TransNewGuinea.org. From Smallhorn, J. 2011. The Binanderean languages of Papua New Guinea: reconstruction and subgrouping. Canberra: Pacific Linguistics.
Proto-Orokaiva. TransNewGuinea.org. From Smallhorn, J. 2011. The Binanderean languages of Papua New Guinea: reconstruction and subgrouping. Canberra: Pacific Linguistics.
Proto-Coastal-Binandere. TransNewGuinea.org. From Smallhorn, J. 2011. The Binanderean languages of Papua New Guinea: reconstruction and subgrouping. Canberra: Pacific Linguistics.
Proto-Baruga. TransNewGuinea.org. From Smallhorn, J. 2011. The Binanderean languages of Papua New Guinea: reconstruction and subgrouping. Canberra: Pacific Linguistics.
Wilson, D. "The Binandere Language Family". In Capell, A., Healey, A. and Wilson, D. editors, Papers in New Guinea Linguistics No. 9. A-18:65-86. Pacific Linguistics, The Australian National University, 1969.

External links 
 Timothy Usher, New Guinea World, Guhu–Oro
Doregari Kotopu Anglican Holy Communion in Binandere, digitized by Richard Mammana and Charles Wohlers
Benunu tepo ae sakrament da kandoari ae ekalesia da jimbo nenei ainda book England da ekalesia da jimbo ango (1959) Book of Common Prayer digitized by Richard Mammana
King, Copland. 1927. Grammar and Dictionary of the Binandere Language, Mamba River, North Division, Papua. Sydney: D.S. Ford. 

 
Binanderean–Goilalan languages
Languages of Oro Province